Blaste is a genus of common barklice in the family Psocidae. There are more than 100 described species in Blaste.

See also
 List of Blaste species

References

External links

 

Psocidae
Articles created by Qbugbot